Rev is the second album by Ten Foot Pole, and the last to feature Scott Radinsky on vocals as the other members wanted the band to become a full time touring band due to the album’s success and his baseball career was getting in the way of that. He would form Pulley shortly after this.  A music video was filmed for the song “Broken Bubble”.

Track listing
"Never Look Back" - 2:20 
"My Wall" - 2:50 
"Old Man" - 3:44 
"Fade Away" - 3:11 
"World's Best Dad" - 2:14 
"Co-Song" - 1:43 
"Closer To Grey" - 3:08 
"Final Hours" - 3:35
"Muffled" - 3:05 
"Broken Bubble" - 2:34 
"Dying Duck In A Thunderstorm" - 3:19 
"Think Of Tomorrow" - 2:22 
"Pete's Farm" - 0:57

Credits

Ten Foot Pole
Scott Radinsky - vocals
Steve Carnan - lead guitar
Tony Palermo - drums
Pete Newbury - bass
Dennis Jagard - guitar

Additional Musicians
Sally Browder - engineer
John Baffa - additional percussion on "My Wall" and "Dying Duck In A Thunderstorm"

Producers
Sally Browder
Ten Foot Pole

1994 albums
Ten Foot Pole albums